The Union of Democrats and Independent Progressives is a political party in Burkina Faso (former Upper Volta. 
At the last legislative elections, 5 May 2002, the party won 0.4% of the popular vote and 1 out of 111 seats.

Political parties in Burkina Faso